Lombardi Engineering Ltd. is a Swiss civil engineering company based in Giubiasco, Bellinzona district. It was established in 1989. It is the successor to "Giovanni Lombardi Ph. D. Consulting Engineers" which was established in 1955 by Giovanni Lombardi. As of 2012, the company employs 200 employees.

Projects
The company is specialized in tunnel ventilation, underground, hydraulic, civil works as well as project studies. It has helped develop projects such St. Gotthard Base Tunnel - Switzerland, AlpTransit, Lyon-Turin Railway, Mont Blanc tunnel and the hypothetical Gibraltar Tunnel linking Africa and Europe through Morocco and Spain.

Engineering Services
The Services provided by the Lombardi Group include:

 Tunnel Ventilation
 Underground
 Hydropower & water engineering
 Electromechanics, fire & life safety
 Transportation
 Geotechnics & Civil Engineering
 Structural Engineering
 Upgrading and Refurbishment
 Project Management and Supervision
 Science & Special studies

Offices
European Offices

Switzerland
 Giubiasco Headquarters
 Lucerne Branch
 Fribourg Branch
Italy
 Milan
 Turin
 Rome
France
 Lyon
 Paris
Austria
 Innsbruck
Belgium
 Bruxelles
Central American Offices

Guatemala
 Guatemala City
Ecuador
 Quito
Peru
 Lima
Chile
 Santiago
Asian Offices

India
 New Delhi

References and notes

External links
 Official website

Design companies established in 1989
Engineering companies of Switzerland
Construction and civil engineering companies of Switzerland
Swiss companies established in 1989
Construction and civil engineering companies  established in 1989